UCHealth University of Colorado Hospital or University Hospital (formerly named Colorado General Hospital) is part of UCHealth (University of Colorado Health) and is a Level I trauma center and the principal teaching hospital for the University of Colorado School of Medicine, located in Aurora, Colorado.

In the 2017–2018 U.S. News & World Report hospital rankings, UCHealth University of Colorado Hospital ranked in the top 50 for 11 medical specialties and was rated the #15 overall adult hospital in the country.

In 2005, UCH was redesignated by the American Nurses Credentialing Center (ANCC) as a magnet facility. In 2010, the hospital received its third redesignation of Magnet status. The hospital is currently pursuing its fourth Magnet designation.

Hospital Safety Rankings

The Leapfrog Hospital Safety Grade is a public service provided by The Leapfrog Group, an independent nonprofit organization committed to driving quality, safety, and transparency in the U.S. health system. For Fall 2021, UCHealth University of Colorado Hospital has maintained its 'D' grade, with 'A' being the highest possible grade and 'F' being the lowest.

Facilities

The Anschutz Inpatient Pavilion 
The Anschutz Outpatient Pavilion
The Anschutz Cancer Pavilion 
Rocky Mountain Lions Eye Institute 
May Bonfils Stanton Clinics 
Center for Dependency, Addiction and Rehabilitation 
The Lone Tree Health Center
Six primary care clinics located in Aurora, Denver, Westminster, Boulder and Lone Tree

History
The University of Colorado University Hospital was originally created on October 1, 1989, as a nonprofit corporation pursuant to an act of the Colorado General Assembly, and after the act was declared unconstitutional by the Colorado Supreme Court in 1990, was recreated in 1991 as the University of Colorado Hospital Authority as a government agency. University of Colorado Health was formed on 31 January 2012 (doing business as UCHealth since 2014) as a joint operating company between the authority and Poudre Valley Health (of Poudre Valley Hospital).

In 2015, Adeptus Health announced a partnership with UCHealth to develop emergency care facilities in Denver, Colorado Springs, and northern Colorado, including 12 existing First Choice emergency rooms along with two new ones.

References

Hospital buildings completed in 1921
Hospitals in Colorado
Education in Aurora, Colorado
Buildings and structures in Aurora, Colorado
Teaching hospitals in the United States
Skyscrapers in Colorado
University of Colorado Denver
Hospital buildings completed in 2004
Trauma centers